Esplanade Riel is a pedestrian bridge located in Winnipeg, Manitoba. It was named in honour of Louis Riel.

It is a side-spar cable-stayed bridge which spans the Red River connecting downtown Winnipeg with St. Boniface; it is paired with a vehicular bridge, the Provencher Bridge. The bridge includes an architectural composite tower that is prestressed with a cantilevered and stayed semi-circular plaza area at the base of the tower. The plaza provides space for commercial activities and as well as a restaurant.

The Esplanade Riel is the only bridge with a restaurant in North America. Its first restaurant was a Salisbury House. Salisbury House is a chain restaurant local to Winnipeg. The next tenant was Chez Sophie sur le pont (on the bridge), which opened in the summer of 2013 and closed in February 2015. The Esplanade Riel has become a landmark and is used in many promotional materials.

Opened to foot traffic in 2003 and having a grand opening in the summer of 2004, the Esplanade Riel was co-designed by architects Guy Préfontaine and Étienne Gaboury of Gaboury Préfontaine Perry Architects Inc. The original drawing rests in the Engineering building of the University of Manitoba in Winnipeg.

The Esplanade Riel was built as part of the Provencher Twin Bridges project, a $72 million project which included a new four-lane divided vehicular bridge as well as new roadways and sidewalks linking the bridges to Downtown Winnipeg and Waterfront Drive.

In January 2013 the City of Winnipeg terminated the lease with Salisbury House and in March the city approved a five-year lease agreement with the French restaurant Chez Sophie sur le pont. The original Chez Sophie, founded in 2005, is located on Avenue de la Cathedrale. The restaurants are operated by Stephane and Sophie Wild, who are from the Alsace region of France. Chez Sophie closed on February 2, 2015.

Mon Ami Louis opened as the new tenant in July 2015, serving more "approachable" fare, as opposed to haute cuisine.  It closed in 2020.

References

External links 
 

Buildings and structures in downtown Winnipeg
Saint Boniface, Winnipeg
Pedestrian bridges in Manitoba
Bridges completed in 2003
Cable-stayed bridges in Canada
Louis Riel